The Governor's Lady is a 1923 American silent drama film directed by Harry Millarde. It was produced and distributed by Fox Film Corporation.

Plot
As described in a film magazine review, Daniel Slade is an energetic and home loving miner who, through some careful real estate transactions, amasses a fortune. When he decides to splurge and run for governor, his wife Mary cannot revert from the petty cares of leaner days. Then a triangle develops through Katherine Strickland desire for power and wealth that Slade could give her, if only he were free. She tells Mrs. Slade that she should leave this part of the country so that no scandal should attach to Daniel while he runs for office. Mary agrees at first, but then realizes that she is being put aside for a younger woman. With this last minute change of heart, even though the divorce has gone through, it is not long before Daniel and Mary are reunited.

Cast
Robert T. Haines as Daniel Slade
Jane Grey as Mrs. Mary Slade
Anna Luther as Katherine Strickland
Frazer Coulter as George Strickland
Leslie Austin as Robert Hayes

Preservation
With no prints of The Governor's Lady located in any film archives, it is a lost film.

See also
1937 Fox vault fire

References

External links

Lobby cards (archived)
Lantern slide (archived)

1923 films
American silent feature films
Lost American films
American black-and-white films
Fox Film films
Films directed by Harry F. Millarde
Silent American drama films
1923 drama films
1923 lost films
Lost drama films
1920s American films